Abraham Fleetwood Luya (1837 – 6 July 1899) was a businessman and politician in Brisbane, Queensland, Australia. He was a mayor of South Brisbane and a member of the Queensland Legislative Assembly.

Early years
Luya was born in Liverpool, England, to parents Abraham Luya and his wife Maria (née Fleetwood). Educated at Liverpool, he worked as a shipping clerk in England before finding work as a midshipman on the Anglia eastern trade. He arrived in New South Wales in 1855 before moving to Queensland in 1864 and worked at several jobs before opening Cootharaba Sawmills in 1869 at Gympie. In 1871, Luya helped established McGhie, Luya & Company, a merchant and sawmilling business (now the heritage-listed Mill Point Settlement archeological site). From 1888 to 1899 he was managing director of the Queensland Milling Company.

Political career
Luya was a member of the Legislative Assembly of Queensland, holding the seat of Brisbane South on two separate occasions, from 1888 until his defeat at the 1893 colonial election, and then from March 1899 until his death four months later.

During his career in parliament he formed an alliance with the Premier of Queensland, Thomas McIlwraith.

Luya was also an alderman in the South Brisbane Municipal Council, serving as its mayor from 1896 to 1898.

Personal life
In 1857 Luya married Eliza Clare (died 1923) in New South Wales and together had 3 sons and six daughters. Luya died in July 1899 and his funeral proceeded from his late residence at Boggo Road Junction to the South Brisbane Cemetery.

References

External links

Members of the Queensland Legislative Assembly
1837 births
1899 deaths
Burials in South Brisbane Cemetery
19th-century Australian politicians
19th-century Australian businesspeople
Politicians from Liverpool
Businesspeople from Liverpool
English emigrants to colonial Australia
Mayors of places in Queensland
19th-century English businesspeople